Jan-Lennard Struff (born 25 April 1990) is a German professional tennis player. He reached his career-high ATP singles ranking of world No. 29 in August 2020. In doubles, he achieved a career-high ranking of world No. 21 in October 2018. He has reached one ATP singles final and won three ATP doubles titles.

Tennis career

2014: First two ATP semifinals, top 50 debut
Struff advanced to his first semifinals on the ATP Tour in Marseille, Munich and Metz. He entered the top 50 in the ATP rankings for the first time in his career and finished the year in the top 100 also for the first time at World No. 59.

2015: Davis Cup debut 
Struff made his Davis Cup debut for Germany against France in the first round. He lost the first rubber to Gilles Simon with 8–10 in the fifth set, and his team lost the tie with 2–3.

2016: First Masters 1000 third rounds, first top-3 win 
Struff reached the third round of the Paris Masters as a qualifier, his best showing at the Masters 1000 level thus far, after beating world No. 3 Stan Wawrinka, saving a match point.

2017: Two more ATP semifinals
Struff reached the semifinals of both Winston-Salem and St. Petersburg.

2018: Australian Open doubles semifinal, first doubles title
Struff got to the semifinals in the Australian Open men's doubles in partnership with Ben McLachlan, including a win over the No. 1 seeds Łukasz Kubot and Marcelo Melo.

At the 2018 Wimbledon Championships, he reached the quarterfinals in doubles, also partnering with McLachlan, where they lost to the wildcard pair of Frederik Nielsen and Joe Salisbury.

In Tokyo, Struff defeated Marin Čilić and had a match point in the second set of his quarterfinal encounter against Denis Shapovalov. At the same tournament, he won the first title of his career in doubles, partnering again with McLachlan.

2019: Second top-3 win, French Open fourth round

Struff started his 2019 season at the Brisbane International. He lost in the first round to Jérémy Chardy. At the ASB Classic in Auckland, he upset fourth seed and world No. 24, Pablo Carreño Busta, in the quarterfinals. He was defeated in the semifinals by British wildcard Cameron Norrie. However, in doubles, he and his partner, Ben McLachlan, won the title, beating Raven Klaasen and Michael Venus in the final. Ranked 51 at the Australian Open, he lost in the first round to Australian Matthew Ebden in four sets.

In February, Struff competed at the Sofia Open. He lost in the second round to second seed and world No. 12, Stefanos Tsitsipas. In Rotterdam, he fell in the first round of qualifying to Dutch wildcard Ryan Nijboer. At the Dubai Championships, he stunned seventh seed and world No. 14, Milos Raonic, in the first round. He was defeated in the second round by Márton Fucsovics. In doubles, he and Ben McLachlan reached the final where they lost to Joe Salisbury and Rajeev Ram. At the Indian Wells Masters, he upset world No. 3 and compatriot, Alexander Zverev, in the third round. He was eliminated from the tournament in the fourth round by 13th seed and world No. 14, Milos Raonic. In Miami, he lost in the first round to American qualifier Reilly Opelka.

Struff started his clay-court season at the Monte-Carlo Masters. He upset 15th seed and world No. 20, Denis Shapovalov, in the first round. He lost in the second round to Grigor Dimitrov. In Barcelona, he beat 10th seed and world No. 22, David Goffin, in the second round. He upset fifth seed and world No. 8, Stefanos Tsitsipas, in the third round for his second Top 10 win of the season. He was defeated in his quarterfinal match by top seed, world No. 2, and eleven-time champion, Rafael Nadal. At the BMW Open in Munich, he lost in the first round to Brazilian qualifier Thiago Monteiro. In Madrid, he was defeated in the second round by ninth seed Marin Čilić. At the Italian Open, he upset ninth seed and world No. 10, Marin Čilić, in the second round. He was eliminated in the third round by world No. 6 Kei Nishikori. Ranked 45 at the French Open, he upset 20th seed and world No. 24, Denis Shapovalov, in the first round. In the third round, he upset 13th seed and world No. 15, Borna Ćorić, in a third round thriller which lasted four-hour-22-minutes. With his third round victory over Ćorić, he reached the fourth round for the first time. He fell in his fourth-round match to world No. 1, Novak Djokovic.

Struff started his grass-court season at the Stuttgart Open. He beat eighth seed and world No. 25, Denis Shapovalov, in the first round. He reached the semifinals where he lost to Matteo Berrettini. In Halle, he was defeated in the second round by third seed and world No. 9, Karen Khachanov. Seeded 33rd at Wimbledon, he made it to the third round, where he lost to Mikhail Kukushkin.

Seeded seventh at the Hamburg Open, Struff lost in the second round to Pablo Carreño Busta.

Seeded 14th at the Citi Open, Struff lost in the second round to Jordan Thompson. At the Rogers Cup in Montreal, he was defeated in the second round by 13th seed and world No. 17, Nikoloz Basilashvili. In Cincinnati, he stunned fifth seed and world No. 7, Stefanos Tsitsipas, in the second round in a tight three-set match. He lost in the third round to ninth seed and world No. 8, and eventual champion, Daniil Medvedev. Ranked 37 at the US Open, he was beaten in the second round by world No. 14 John Isner.

Seeded eighth at the Moselle Open, Struff lost in the first round to Pierre-Hugues Herbert. In Tokyo, he was defeated in the first round by Japanese wildcard Go Soeda. At the Shanghai Masters, he was eliminated from the tournament in the first round by 11th seed and world No. 13, Matteo Berrettini. Seeded seventh at the European Open, he lost in the second round to Frances Tiafoe. At the Swiss Indoors, he reached the quarterfinals where he was defeated by eventual finalist Alex de Minaur. At the Paris Masters, he upset world No. 8 and defending champion, Karen Khachanov, in the second round for the seventh Top 10 win of his career. He lost in the third round to Jo-Wilfried Tsonga in three sets.

2020: Top 30 debut
Struff started his 2020 season by representing Germany at the 1st edition of the ATP Cup. Germany was in Group F alongside Australia, Greece, and Canada. Against Australia, he lost to Nick Kyrgios. Against Greece, he won his match over Michail Pervolarakis. Against Canada, he got the victory over Félix Auger-Aliassime. In the end, Germany ended 3rd in Group F. Seeded seventh at the first edition of the Adelaide International, he lost in the second round to Australian wildcard Alex Bolt. Ranked 37 at the Australian Open, he was defeated in the first round by world No. 2, seven-time champion, and eventual champion, Novak Djokovic, in four sets.

At the Rotterdam Open, Struff lost in the first round to eventual finalist, Félix Auger-Aliassime, in three sets. However, in doubles, he and his partner, Henri Kontinen, reached the final where they lost to Pierre-Hugues Herbert and Nicolas Mahut. In Dubai, he upset fifth seed, world No. 12, and 2018 champion, Roberto Bautista Agut, in the first round. He reached the quarterfinals where he fell to second seed, world No. 6, last year finalist, and eventual finalist, Stefanos Tsitsipas, in three sets. Representing Germany in the Davis Cup tie against Belarus, he won both of his rubbers by beating Ilya Ivashka and Egor Gerasimov. Germany ended up winning the tie over Belarus 4-1. The ATP Tour cancelled all tournaments from March through July due to the COVID-19 pandemic.

When the ATP Tour resumed tournament play in August, Fucsovics competed at the Western & Southern Open. This event usually takes place in Cincinnati but this year, it was held at the USTA Billie Jean King National Tennis Center in New York City in order to reduce unnecessary player travel by centralizing the tournament and the subsequent US Open in the same venue. He upset 12th seed and world No. 17, Denis Shapovalov, in the second round. He then upset seventh seed and world No. 10, David Goffin, in the third round to earn his best ATP Masters 1000 showing by reaching the quarterfinals. He ended up losing his quarterfinal match to world No. 1, 2018 champion, and eventual champion, Novak Djokovic. As a result, he entered the top 30 for the first time in his career and reached a career-high in singles of World No. 29 on 31 August 2020. Seeded 28th at the US Open, he made it to the third round where he was defeated by three-time champion Djokovic.

At the Italian Open, Struff lost in the first round to qualifier Federico Coria. In Hamburg, he was defeated in the first round by eighth seed and world No. 16, Karen Khachanov. Seeded 30th at the French Open, he was eliminated from the tournament in the second round by qualifier and compatriot, Daniel Altmaier.

Seeded seventh at the Bett1Hulks Indoors, Struff lost in the first round to qualifier and compatriot, Oscar Otte. Seeded seventh at the Bett1Hulks Championship, he was defeated in the second round by Yoshihito Nishioka. In Vienna, he was beaten in the first round by third seed and world No. 5, Stefanos Tsitsipas. At the Paris Masters, he lost in the second round to ninth seed and world No. 15, Pablo Carreño Busta. Struff played his final tournament of the season at the Sofia Open. Seeded fourth, he lost in the second round to eventual finalist Vasek Pospisil.

Struff ended the year ranked 36.

2021: ATP Cup semifinalist, first ATP Tour final, second French Open 4th round
Struff started his 2021 season at the Antayla Open. Seeded fifth, he reached the quarterfinals where he lost to Jérémy Chardy, despite having two match points in the third-set tie breaker. In February, he represented Germany with Alexander Zverev, Kevin Krawietz and Andreas Mies at the ATP Cup. Germany was in Group A alongside Canada and Serbia. He beat Milos Raonic of Canada, and Dušan Lajović of Serbia to help Germany qualify for the semifinals. In the semifinal tie against Russia, he lost to Andrey Rublev in three sets. In the end, Russia beat Germany 2-1 to advance to the ATP Cup final. At the Australian Open, he lost in the first round to Australian wildcard Christopher O'Connell.

Seeded eighth at the Open Sud de France, Struff was defeated in the first round by qualifier and compatriot, Peter Gojowczyk. In Rotterdam, he was beaten in the first round by sixth seed, world No. 14, and 2017 finalist, David Goffin. At the Dubai Championships, he lost in the second round to third seed and world No. 12, Denis Shapovalov. Seeded 31st at the Miami Open, he made it to the third round where he was eliminated by seventh seed and world No. 12, Roberto Bautista Agut.

Struff started his clay-court season at the Sardegna Open. Seeded fifth, he reached the quarterfinals where he fell to fourth seed Nikoloz Basilashvili. In Monte-Carlo, he lost in the first round to 14th seed and world No. 17, Grigor Dimitrov. Seeded seventh at the BMW Open in Munich, he reached his first ATP singles final after defeating fourth seed, Filip Krajinović, in the quarterfinals, after a three hour match, and qualifier, Ilya Ivashka, in the semifinals. This was his best performance at this tournament since reaching the semifinals in 2014 (l. to Fabio Fognini). He lost in the final to fifth seed Nikoloz Basilashvili. At the Madrid Open, he was eliminated from the tournament in the first round by qualifier Alexei Popyrin. In Rome, he lost in the second round to world No. 7, Andrey Rublev, in three sets. Seeded fourth at the first edition of the Emilia-Romagna Open in Parma, Italy, he reached the quarterfinals where he lost to sixth seed Tommy Paul. Ranked 42 at the French Open, he upset world No. 7, Andrey Rublev, in the first round in five sets. He proceeded to the fourth round after wins over Facundo Bagnis and qualifier Carlos Alcaraz. He lost in the fourth round to world No. 10 Diego Schwartzman.

Struff began his grass-court season at the Halle Open. He stunned top seed and world No. 2, Daniil Medvedev, in the first round. He lost in the second round to qualifier, Marcos Giron, in three sets. At the first edition of the Mallorca Championships, he was defeated in the first round by Adrian Mannarino. Ranked 45 at Wimbledon, he lost in the first round to world No. 2, Daniil Medvedev, in four sets.

After Wimbledon, Struff competed at the Hamburg European Open. Seeded seventh, he lost in the first round to Laslo Đere. Representing Germany at the Summer Olympics, he was defeated in the second round by world No. 1 Novak Djokovic.

At the National Bank Open in Toronto, Struff lost in the first round to Fabio Fognini. In Cincinnati, he was beaten in the first round by lucky loser and compatriot, Dominik Koepfer. Seeded ninth at the Winston-Salem Open, he lost in the third round to eventual champion Ilya Ivashka. At the US Open, he was defeated in the first round by Tallon Griekspoor in five sets.

At the Moselle Open in Metz, Struff was beaten in the first round by Mikael Ymer. In October, he competed at the Indian Wells Masters. He lost in the second round to 25th seed and world No. 30, Fabio Fognini. At the European Open in Antwerp, he was eliminated in the second round by seventh seed Lloyd Harris. In St. Petersburg, Russia, he upset second seed and world No. 13, Denis Shapovalov, in the quarterfinals. He lost his semifinal match to fifth seed and world No. 28, Taylor Fritz. At the Paris Masters, he fell in the first round to qualifier Tommy Paul. In his final tournament of the season, Struff represented Germany at the Davis Cup Finals. Germany was in Group F alongside Serbia and Austria. Against Serbia, he lost to Novak Djokovic. Against Serbia, he beat Dennis Novak. Germany beat Serbia and Austria 2-1 to advance to the quarterfinals. Playing Great Britain in the quarterfinals, he defeated Cam Norrie in three sets. Germany beat Great Britain 2-1 to advance to the semifinals. In the semifinals against Russia, he lost to Daniil Medvedev. Germany ended up losing to Russia 1-2.

Struff ended the year ranked 51.

2022: Injury, out of clay-court season, Challenger title, back to top 150
Struff began his 2022 season by representing Germany at the ATP Cup. Germany was in Group C alongside Canada, Great Britain, and the USA. In his first match, he lost to Dan Evans of Great Britain. In his second match, he defeated John Isner of the USA. In his final match, he lost to Denis Shapovalov of Canada. Germany ended in third place in Group C. At the Adelaide International 2, he lost in the first round to qualifier Corentin Moutet. Ranked No. 52 at the Australian Open, he was defeated in the first round by Botic van de Zandschulp.

In February, Struff competed at the Dubai Championships. He lost in the first round to qualifier Ričardas Berankis. Representing Germany in the Davis Cup tie against Brazil, he played one match and lost to Thiago Monteiro. In the end, Germany won the tie over Brazil 3-1. At the Indian Wells Masters, he fell in the first round to lucky loser John Millman. Seeded fourth at the Arizona Tennis Classic, an ATP Challenger event, he was eliminated in the first round by lucky loser and compatriot, Mats Moraing. However, in doubles, he and his partner Oscar Otte reached the final and lost to Treat Huey and Denis Kudla. At the Miami Open, Struff retired during his first-round match against Pedro Martínez due to a right foot injury.
Due to that injury, Struff missed these clay-court tournaments: Grand Prix Hassan II, Barcelona Open, BMW Open, Geneva Open, and French Open.

Struff returned to action during the grass-court season in June at the BOSS Open in Stuttgart. Playing as a wildcard, he won his first match since January by beating Marcos Giron in the first round in three sets. He lost in the second round to sixth seed Lorenzo Sonego. In Halle, he was defeated in the first round by Ilya Ivashka. At the Mallorca Championships, he fell in the first round of qualifying to Fernando Verdasco. Ranked No. 155 at Wimbledon, he faced fifth seed and world No. 7, Carlos Alcaraz, in the first round. He pushed Alcaraz to five sets, but he ended up losing the match.

After Wimbledon, Struff competed at the Brawo Open, an ATP Challenger event in Braunschweig, Germany. He won his 6th ATP Challenger tour title by beating compatriot, Maximilian Marterer, in the final. He returned to the top 150 at world No. 126 on 11 July 2022. He also won the doubles title with Marcelo Demoliner by defeating Roman Jebavý and Adam Pavlásek in the final. In Hamburg, he lost in the first round to seventh seed and world No. 26, Karen Khachanov, in three sets, despite having two match points at 6-5 in the third set. Seeded third at the first edition of the Zug Open, he was eliminated from the tournament in the second round by Italian qualifier Lorenzo Giustino. Seeded third at the Meerbusch Challenger, he was beaten in the second round by eventual finalist Dennis Novak. At the US Open, Struff fell in the second round of qualifying to Enzo Couacaud.

After the US Open, Struff competed at the Cassis Open. Seeded fifth, he lost in the second round to Borna Gojo. Then, he represented Germany in the Davis Cup Finals Group stage. Germany was in Group C alongside France, Belgium, and Australia. He beat Benjamin Bonzi of France, Zizou Bergs of Belgium, and Max Purcell of Australia. Germany did end up beating France, Belgium, and Australia which earned them a spot in the Knockout stage. Getting past qualifying at the Sofia Open, he reached the quarterfinals where he was defeated by fourth seed Lorenzo Musetti. In Basel, he lost in the first round of qualifying to Roman Safiullin. At the Trofeo Faip–Perrel, he made it to the final where he was defeated by Otto Virtanen. At the Slovak Open, he lost in the first round to eventual finalist Fábián Marozsán. Struff played his final event of the year by representing Germany in the Davis Cup quarterfinal tie against Canada. He upset world No. 18 Denis Shapovalov. In the end, Germany ended up losing 2-1 to Canada.

Struff ended the year ranked 152.

2023
In January, Struff started his 2023 season at the Canberra Challenger. He reached the semifinals where he lost to Leandro Riedi.
Struff qualified for his ninth career-appearance in the main draw at the 2023 Australian Open.

Performance timelines

Singles
Current through the 2023 Indian Wells Masters.

Doubles
Current through the 2023 Qatar Open.

ATP Tour finals

Singles: 1 (1 runner-up)

Doubles: 6 (3 titles, 3 runner-ups)

ATP Challenger and ITF Futures finals

Singles: 30 (12–18)

Doubles: 9 (7–2)

Playing style
Struff is a power baseliner type player. He possesses a strong serve along with a heavy forehand and solid backhand. When he plays well he can dictate play from the back of the court and hit winners from the forehand and backhand side. He also has a solid volley.

Record against top-10 players
Struff's match record against players who have been ranked world No. 10 or higher, with those who are active in boldface.
Only ATP Tour main draw and Davis Cup matches are considered.
 Statistics correct .

Wins over top 10 players
 He has a  record against players who were, at the time the match was played, ranked in the top 10.

National participation

Davis Cup (17–8)

ATP Cup (7–5)

References

External links

 Official website
 
 
 

1990 births
Living people
German male tennis players
Olympic tennis players of Germany
Tennis players at the 2016 Summer Olympics
Tennis players at the 2020 Summer Olympics
Tennis people from North Rhine-Westphalia